Tumen, also known as Tumin, is a census village in East Sikkim district, Sikkim, India. The village is located 32 km from Gangtok.

According to the 2011 Census of India, Tumen village has a total population of 2,974 people including 1,522 males and 1,452 females. The literacy rate per the census of the village is 62.10%.

Tourist attraction 
The Tumen monastery, built in 1915, is a major tourist attraction in the village.

References 

Villages in Sikkim